Timothy Hayes Murnane (June 4, 1851 – February 7, 1917) was an American sportswriter specializing in baseball, regarded as the leading baseball writer at The Boston Globe for about 30 years until his death. At the same time, he organized and led professional sports leagues and helped govern the baseball industry. He had been a professional baseball player, and played several seasons in the major leagues as a first baseman and center fielder.

Biography

Early life
Born in Naugatuck, Connecticut, Murnane acquired his Irish brogue from his father, an Irish immigrant.  Little is known about his childhood; he mentioned in one of his newspaper columns that he attended school in a one-room rural schoolhouse. While some sources say Murnane attended Holy Cross prep school in Worcester, Massachusetts, this is doubtful; searches in the school's archives show there was another man with the same name who attended, but he was from Fitchburg, Massachusetts, and Murnane was playing baseball in Connecticut during the years he was said to be at Holy Cross.

Playing career
Murnane remained at catcher for two seasons with the Savannah Seniors, but moved to center field while with the Middletown Mansfields club of Middletown, Connecticut, halfway through the  season. He was the Mansfields' regular first basemen; that would be his most common fielding position but he played only a few full seasons "every day".

Following the 1872 Mansfields, Murnane played in the majors for the Philadelphia Athletics (1873–74), Philadelphia White Stockings (1875), Boston Red Caps (1876–77), Providence Grays (1878)—as the first player signed by a new club—and finally the Boston Reds (1884), whom he also managed.

During eight seasons in the major leagues Murnane batted .261 with five home runs and 127 runs batted in. Highlights of his playing days would include finishing fifth in the National Association batting race with an average of .359 in 1872, and leading the NA with 30 stolen bases in 1875.

While Providence won the championship in its second season, the 27-year-old Murnane was no longer on the team or in the league. In 1879 and 1880, he played part-time for Capital City (in Albany, New York), Rochester, and Albany, before retiring "to open a saloon and billard hall in Boston".

Murnane returned to baseball and the major leagues for one year when the Union Association challenged the newly organized baseball industry, placing one of its eight clubs in Boston, backed by George Wright with Murnane one minor investor. Only 32, he served as recruiter, captain, and first baseman of the Boston Reds and guided them to a fifth-place finish with a record of 58–51. They did not threaten the National League in Boston, home to the NL's champion team and one of its anchor franchises. Rather, the Reds or "Unions" were a welcome but decidedly lesser attraction when the Beaneaters were out of town.

Later career

After his career in uniform, Murnane served as president of the minor league New England League and Eastern League, and went on to a 30-year career as a sportswriter and baseball editor with The Boston Globe.

Death
Murnane died in 1917 at age 65 of a heart attack while attending the opera at the Schubert Theatre in Boston. News reports said his death came only about 30 minutes after he had written his daily sports column for the Globe.  He was originally buried in the Old Dorchester Burial Ground in Dorchester.  Hundreds attended Murnane’s funeral. The pallbearers included Boston mayor James Michael Curley and Congressman James A. Gallivan; former Red Sox owner John I. Taylor was an usher. Many ballplayers attended, including Babe Ruth, then a pitcher for the Red Sox. Murnane's place of burial was later moved to the Old Calvary Cemetery in Roslindale.

Murnane had left little to care for his widow and four children from his second marriage, so the American League and the Baseball Writers' Association of America (BBWAA) established a memorial fund for his family and held a benefit game on September 27, 1917, at Fenway Park. The Red Sox, with Babe Ruth pitching, defeated an all-star team that include Ty Cobb, Tris Speaker, and Shoeless Joe Jackson in the outfield. More than 17,000 people attended, generating $13,000 for the Murnane family.  The memorial fund purchased a gravestone for Murnane.

In 1946, the Baseball Hall of Fame established the Honor Rolls of Baseball and named Murnane one of 12 writers to be honored. He was selected by the BBWAA as a recipient of the J. G. Taylor Spink Award for excellence in baseball journalism in 1978.

See also

List of Major League Baseball player-managers

Sources
Eldred, Rich (1996). "Timothy Hayes Murnane". Baseball's First Stars. Edited by Frederick Ivor-Campbell, et al. Cleveland, Ohio: SABR. 
Retrosheet. "Tim Murnane". Retrieved 2022-03-16.

References

Further reading
 Murnane, T. H. (1903) How to play base ball. New York: American Sports Publishing Co.

External links

Baseball Hall of Fame – Spink Award recipient

1851 births
1917 deaths
Baseball writers
Sportswriters from Massachusetts
Major League Baseball first basemen
Major League Baseball outfielders
19th-century baseball players
Middletown Mansfields players
Philadelphia Athletics (NA) players
Philadelphia White Stockings players
Boston Red Caps players
Providence Grays players
Boston Reds (UA) players
Boston Reds (UA) managers
Baseball players from Connecticut
College of the Holy Cross alumni
Capital City of Albany players
Rochester Hop Bitters players
Jersey City Skeeters players
Major League Baseball player-managers
BBWAA Career Excellence Award recipients
People from Naugatuck, Connecticut
Sportspeople from New Haven County, Connecticut
The Boston Globe people